Al-Akkhum is a sub-district located in Jabal Iyal Yazid District, 'Amran Governorate, Yemen. Al-Akkhum had a population of 6982 according to the 2004 census.

References 

Sub-districts in Jabal Iyal Yazid District